The Gay Corinthian is a 1924 British silent historical drama film directed by Arthur Rooke and starring Victor McLaglen, Betty Faire and Cameron Carr. It was shot at Leyton Studios.

Cast
 Victor McLaglen as Squire Hardcastle  
 Betty Faire as Lady Carrie Fanshawe  
 Cameron Carr as Lord Barrymore  
 Humberston Wright as Sir Thomas Apreece 
 Donald Macardle as Harry Fanshawe  
 George Turner as Jeremy  
 Guardsman Penwill as Flaming Tinman  
 Noel Arnott as Gentleman Jeffries 
 Jack Denton as Dr. Lee

References

Bibliography
 Low, Rachael. History of the British Film, 1918-1929. George Allen & Unwin, 1971.
 Warren, Patricia. British Film Studios: An Illustrated History. Batsford, 2001.

External links
 

1924 films
British silent feature films
Films directed by Arthur Rooke
British historical drama films
1920s historical drama films
British black-and-white films
1924 drama films
1920s English-language films
1920s British films
Silent historical drama films